The following lists events that happened during 1959 in Laos.

Incumbents
Monarch: Sisavang Vong (abdicated 29 October), Savang Vatthana (ascended 29 October)
Prime Minister: Phoui Sananikone (until 31 December), Sounthone Pathammavong (starting 31 December)

Events

January
22 January - Project Hotfoot (Laos)  begins.

July 
28-31 July - North Vietnamese invasion of Laos: North Vietnamese Army units attack Laos in support of the Pathet Lao.

September
7 September - United Nations Security Council Resolution 132  is adopted.

Deaths 
14 October - Phetsarath Ratanavongsa
29 October - Sisavang Vong
29 December - Katay Don Sasorith

References

 
1950s in Laos
Years of the 20th century in Laos
Laos
Laos